The Sacramento Valley Railroad (SVRR) was incorporated on August 4, 1852, the first transit railroad company incorporated in California.  Construction did not begin until February 1855 because of financial and right of way issues, and its first train operated on February 22, 1856.  Although the oldest working railroad in the state was the Arcata and Mad River Railroad, first operational in December 15, 1854, the Sacramento Valley Railroad was the West's pioneering incorporated railroad, forerunner to the Central Pacific.

Original SVRR route

On August 4, 1852, the Sacramento Valley Railroad was incorporated in California, and Charles Lincoln Wilson became its first president. He left for New York to find expertise and private funds for the railroad effort; he recruited a young survey engineer Theodore D. Judah from New York to come west with him to Sacramento. Judah arrived in mid-May 1854, and on May 30 his report and preliminary survey for the proposed SVRR line eastward from Sacramento to Marysville by way of Folsom were in the hands of his employers.

Because of financial and right of way issues, construction with grading subcontractors did not begin until February 1855, but soon other problems arose.  In August 1855, the SVRR board elected Commodore C. K. Garrison, former mayor (1853-1854) of San Francisco, as president of SVRR.  They also elected as vice president of SVRR the future American Civil War General William Tecumseh Sherman, who was at that time the head of the banking house of Lucas & Turner in San Francisco. William Sherman, contacted his brother John, who had recently been elected to Congress, for help in obtaining federal land grants for the railroad, but to no avail.

The board also in August 1855 announced that the actual laying of tracks can begin. Mastering the technique, the track laying crew were putting down six hundred feet of track daily.

The original plans for a line from Sacramento to Folsom and then to Marysville were not fully realized as the funding did not materialize. As constructed, the Sacramento Valley Railroad ran from the Sacramento River levee at Front and "L" Street in present-day Old Sacramento and terminated at Folsom. On February 22, 1856, the first train operated over the entire  line.

Theodore Judah was the Chief Engineer of the Sacramento Valley Railroad. Judah would later become the Chief Engineer of the Central Pacific Railroad and the chief proponent of the first transcontinental railroad over the Sierra Nevada by way of Dutch Flat.

In August 1865, Central Pacific Railroad maneuvered its way to buy controlling interest in the management of Sacramento Valley, diverting the profitable over-mountain Washoe trade and travel, potentially worth several million dollars annually, to Central Pacific and leaving local trade and travel to Sacramento Valley. Thereafter, the gauge of its track and all its rolling stock was changed to correspond with the standard gauge of the Pacific Railroad.

On April 19, 1877, the Sacramento Valley Railroad was consolidated with the Folsom and Placerville Railroad to form the Sacramento and Placerville Railroad. In 1877 the Placerville and Sacramento Valley Railroad was also deeded to the Sacramento and Placerville Railroad.

The railroad eventually came under the control of the Southern Pacific Railroad (SP); first under SP's subsidiary, the Northern Railway in 1888, and then ten years later under the SP on April 14, 1898.

The route as it exists now
Today much of the original route still exists and was the former Placerville Branch of the Southern Pacific. The Placerville Industrial Lead is used by Union Pacific Railroad and extends to the Aerojet facility just west of Folsom. The Sacramento RT Light Rail Gold Line parallels the route and uses the right of way between Sacramento and Folsom.

Most of SVRR's planned route was built by subsequent railroad companies after 1869.  A notable historic section is still in operation today as Niles Canyon Railway that linked Sacramento to the San Francisco Bay Area through Niles, California.

See also

 History of rail transportation in California
 California Central Railroad

References

Further reading

Defunct California railroads
Predecessors of the Southern Pacific Transportation Company
Railway companies established in 1852
Railway companies disestablished in 1877
5 ft 3½ in gauge railways
1852 establishments in California
American companies disestablished in 1877
American companies established in 1852